The Bronx Central Annex of the United States Postal Service is a historic post office building located at 558 Grand Concourse in Concourse, the Bronx, New York, United States. The four-story structure was built from 1935 to 1937. The building was sold in 2014 and is being transformed into retail, postal service, office and restaurant space.

The building was listed as a New York City Landmark in 1975 and on the National Register of Historic Places in 1980. Additional city landmark status was granted in 2013 to the interior, which includes a notable series of New Deal-era murals in fresco created in 1939 by Ben Shahn and Bernarda Bryson Shahn for the Treasury Department Art Project's Section of Fine Arts.

Building
Located at 558 Grand Concourse, Bronx General Post Office was built from 1935 to 1937, and designed by consulting architect Thomas Harlan Ellett for the Office of the Supervising Architect. Constructed of smooth gray brick and is surrounded by a granite terrace, the building features graceful window openings set within marble arches.

On the terrace are two sculptures dating to 1936: The Letter by Henry Kreis and Noah by Charles Rudy.

Murals
The interior features Resources of America, a set of 13 mural panels in fresco inspired by the words of Walt Whitman. They were executed by Ben Shahn and his wife Bernarda Bryson Shahn and completed in August 1939. The government hired Shahn through an anonymous competition after he became renown for his artwork. The murals celebrate American industry and the dignity of labor.

Sale
In January 2013 the U.S. Postal Service announced that it was considering selling the Bronx General Post Office as part of its national reevaluation of facilities. Noting that the building comprises , the Postal Service stated that most of the operations once performed there had been relocated. The sale of some 200 buildings was being considered in light of declining mail volume and the growth of online services. "There are lots of quite significant post office buildings that are threatened because the Postal Service itself is threatened", said National Building Museum curator G. Martin Moeller Jr. The property was one of those most architecturally distinguished, and its interior was granted landmark status December 17, 2013, to preserve Shahn's mural series, Resources of America. Despite protests from preservationists and the community, plans for the sale went forward.

The building was purchased by Manhattan marketplace developer YoungWoo & Associates in September 2014 for $19 million. In February 2015 the Landmarks Preservation Commission approved the redevelopment of the property with retail space and postal services on the ground and main floors, office space on the upper two floors, and a restaurant on the roof. The plan included restoration of the exterior, the 13 murals, and the lobby which had been remodeled over the years. In 2019, the first rooftop restaurant in the Bronx, Zona de Cuba, opened on the property.

References

External links 

 Bronx Annex described at Lehman College Art Gallery

Bronx Central Annex-U.S. Post Office
Government buildings completed in 1935
Government buildings in the Bronx
National Register of Historic Places in the Bronx
New York City Designated Landmarks in the Bronx